Thomas Harold Massie (born January 13, 1971) is an American politician and businessman. A member of the Republican Party, Massie has been the United States representative for Kentucky's 4th congressional district since 2012, when he defeated Bill Adkins in the special and general elections. The district covers much of northeastern Kentucky, but is dominated by the Kentucky side of the Cincinnati area and Louisville's eastern suburbs.

Before joining Congress, Massie was Judge-Executive of Lewis County, Kentucky, from 2011 to 2012. He also ran a start-up company based in Massachusetts, where he previously studied at the Massachusetts Institute of Technology (MIT).

Massie has been described as a libertarian Republican and a member of the Tea Party movement, which backed his candidacy for Congress in 2012.

Early life, education, and business career 
Massie was born in Huntington, West Virginia. He grew up in Vanceburg, Kentucky. He met his wife Rhonda at Lewis County High School in Vanceburg. His father was a beer distributor.

Massie earned a bachelor of science degree in electrical engineering and a master of science degree in mechanical engineering from Massachusetts Institute of Technology (MIT). He participated in the MIT Solar Car Club, which took second place behind a Swiss team in the Solar and Electric 500 at the Phoenix International Raceway in 1991. At the time, the team set several world records including a lap speed in excess of 62 mph (99 km/h), and straightaway speeds in excess of 70 mph (112 km/h).

In 1992, Massie won MIT's then-named 2.70 ("Introduction to Design and Manufacturing", now named 2.007) Design Competition. MIT professor Woodie Flowers, who pioneered the 2.70 contest, mentioned that Massie watched this contest on television in seventh grade and wanted to come to MIT to win it.

In 1993, at MIT, Massie and his wife started a company called SensAble Devices Inc. He completed his bachelor's degree the same year and wrote his thesis, Design of a three-degree of Freedom force-reflecting haptic interface. In 1995 Massie won the $30,000 Lemelson-MIT Student Prize for inventors and the $10,000 David and Lindsay Morgenthaler Grand Prize in the sixth annual MIT $10K Entrepreneurial Business Plan Competition. In 1996 his company was reincorporated as SensAble Technologies, Inc., after partner Bill Aulet joined. It raised $32 million of venture capital, had 24 patents, and 70 other employees.

In 1996, Massie completed a master's of science degree (SM) with his thesis "Initial haptic explorations with the phantom: virtual touch through point interaction".

Lewis County Judge Executive 
In 2010, Massie ran for Judge Executive of Lewis County. He won the primary election, defeating the incumbent by a large margin, and then beat the Democratic nominee by nearly 40 points. Massie also campaigned for then-U.S. Senate candidate Rand Paul, speaking to various Tea Party groups on his behalf.

Massie resigned as Lewis County Judge-Executive effective July 1, 2012.

U.S. House of Representatives

Elections

2012 

In December 2011, Congressman Geoff Davis announced his decision to retire from his seat in Kentucky's 4th congressional district. Massie announced his candidacy on January 10, 2012. He was endorsed by Senator Paul and Texas Congressman Ron Paul. He was also endorsed by FreedomWorks, Club for Growth, Gun Owners of America, and Young Americans for Liberty.

On May 22, 2012, Massie won the Republican nomination, beating his closest opponents, State Representative Alecia Webb-Edgington and Boone County Judge Executive Gary Moore, by a double-digit margin. In his victory speech, Massie thanked "the Tea Party, the liberty movement, and grassroots Ronald Reagan Republicans". He faced Democratic nominee Bill Adkins in the general election, and was expected to win the election by a wide margin. Massie resigned as Lewis County Judge-Executive effective July 1, 2012, to focus on his campaign for Congress and allow an election to be immediately held in order to replace him. He was succeeded by Deputy Lewis County Judge-Executive John Patrick Collins, who was appointed temporarily by Governor Steve Beshear. On July 31, 2012, Congressman Geoff Davis resigned from office, citing a family health issue for his abrupt departure. On August 1, 2012, the Republican Party committee for Kentucky's 4th Congressional district voted unanimously to endorse Massie as the party's nominee once a special election was called. Beshear called a special election to take place on the same day as the general election, November 6. This meant Massie ran in two separate elections on the same daya special election for the right to serve the final two months of Davis's fourth term (within the lines that had been drawn after the 2000 Census), and a regular election for a full two-year term (within the lines that had been drawn for the 2010 census). On November 6, Massie won both elections by a wide margin.

Tenure 

Massie was sworn in for the balance of Davis's term on November 13, 2012. He thus gained two months' seniority on the rest of the 2012 House freshman class. As a measure of how much the Cincinnati suburbs have dominated the district, he became the first congressman from the district's eastern portion in 45 years.

Upon arriving in Congress he was assigned to serve on three committees: Transportation and Infrastructure, Oversight and Government Reform, and Science, Space and Technology. He later became chair of the Subcommittee on Technology and Innovation, replacing outgoing chair Ben Quayle.

Massie broke from the majority of his party by opposing the reelection of Speaker of the House John Boehner, instead casting his vote for Justin Amash of Michigan. In May 2013, he voted against the Stolen Valor Act of 2013, which passed 390–3. In December 2013, he was the only congressman to vote against the Undetectable Firearms Act.

In March 2014, Massie voted against a bill to name Israel an American strategic partner. Massie voted no because the bill would have subsidized green energy companies in Israel. He said he would not support subsidies for American green energy companies, let alone foreign ones. The bill passed by a margin of 410–1.

In May 2014, Massie objected to a voice vote to award golf star Jack Nicklaus a gold medal recognizing his "service to the nation", and demanded a roll call vote. The vote passed easily, 371–10. Through mid-June 2014, Massie had voted "no" at least 324 times in the 113th Congress – opposing one of every three measures that came to the House floor. Politico named him "Mr. No".

In 2015, Massie was the sole member of the House to vote "present" on the Joint Comprehensive Plan of Action, also known as the Iran nuclear agreement, citing Constitutional concerns that the treaties are not ratified by the House of Representatives and that he had no authority to vote for or against the nuclear deal. In November 2016, he voted against an extension of U.S. sanctions against Iran, the only member of the House to do so.

In 2017, Massie introduced a one-page bill that would abolish the United States Department of Education, and cosponsored a bill that would abolish the Environmental Protection Agency.

In April 2017, Massie expressed skepticism over the role of Syrian president Bashar al-Assad in the 2017 Khan Shaykhun chemical attack.

On May 4, 2017, Massie was the sole House member to vote against sanctions on North Korea.

In July 2017, Massie joined Representatives Amash and John Duncan Jr., and Senators Rand Paul and Bernie Sanders in opposing a bill to impose new economic sanctions against Russia, Iran, and North Korea. President Donald Trump opposed the bill, arguing that relations with Russia were already "at an all-time and dangerous low". He did, however, sign the bill.

On December 29, 2017, Massie voted for the Tax Cuts and Jobs Act. Before voting, he said he would support the bill to cut taxes, but that he would oppose "new government spending," despite the $1.5 trillion estimated to be added to the national debt according to the Congressional Budget Office in wake of the bill being passed.

In October 2018, Massie spoke at the John Birch Society’s 60th anniversary celebration. He talked about government corruption and spoke out against the advisability of an Article V Convention to amend the Constitution.

On March 26, 2019, Massie was one of 14 Republicans to vote with all House Democrats to override Trump's veto of a measure unwinding Trump's declaration of a national emergency at the southern border.

In 2019, Massie signed a letter to Trump led by Representative Ro Khanna and Senator Rand Paul asserting that it was "long past time to rein in the use of force that goes beyond congressional authorization" and that they hoped this would "serve as a model for ending hostilities in the future – in particular, as you and your administration seek a political solution to our involvement in Afghanistan." Massie was also one of nine lawmakers to sign a letter to Trump requesting a meeting with him and urging him to sign "Senate Joint Resolution 7, which invokes the War Powers Act of 1973 to end unauthorized US military participation in the Saudi-led coalition's armed conflict against Yemen's Houthi forces, initiated in 2015 by the Obama administration". They asserted that the "Saudi-led coalition's imposition of an air-land-and-sea blockade as part of its war against Yemen's Houthis has continued to prevent the unimpeded distribution of these vital commodities, contributing to the suffering and death of vast numbers of civilians throughout the country" and that Trump's approval of the resolution through his signing would give a "powerful signal to the Saudi-led coalition to bring the four-year-old war to a close".

On April 10, 2019, during former United States Secretary of State John Kerry's testimony to the House Oversight and Reform Committee, Massie called Kerry's political science degree from Yale University a "pseudoscience degree" and called Kerry's position on climate change "pseudoscience." Kerry responded, "Are you serious? I mean this is really a serious happening here?" CNN and The Washington Post called Massie's exchange with Kerry "surreal" and "bizarre".

In July 2019, Massie was the only Republican among 17 members of Congress to vote against a House resolution opposing efforts to boycott Israel and the Global Boycott, Divestment, and Sanctions movement.

On November 20, 2019, Massie was the sole "no" vote in Congress on the Hong Kong Human Rights and Democracy Act of 2019, which he called an "escalation" with the People's Republic of China.

In July 2021, Massie voted against the bipartisan ALLIES Act, which would increase by 8,000 the number of special immigrant visas for Afghan allies of the U.S. military during its invasion of Afghanistan, while also reducing some application requirements that caused long application backlogs; the bill passed the House, 407–16.

In September 2021, Massie was the only Republican to vote against $1 billion of funding for Israel's Iron Dome missile defense system.

In May 2022, Massie was the only member of the House of Representatives to oppose a non-binding resolution denouncing antisemitism. Massie tweeted that he voted against the bill because it promoted censorship.

COVID-19 pandemic response 
On March 27, 2020, in the midst of the COVID-19 pandemic, Massie forced the return to Washington of members of the House who were "sheltering in place" in their districts by threatening a quorum call that would have required an in-person vote on the $2.2 trillion aid package that had passed the Senate by a 96–0 vote. Before Massie arrived on the House floor, just two representatives were present to pass the bill by voice vote. On the House floor, Massie said he was trying to "make sure our republic doesn't die by unanimous consent in an empty chamber." His actions caused widespread concern about endangering members of Congress by requiring them to gather amid a pandemic.

After Massie's unsuccessful push, Trump said Massie should be removed from the Republican Party, calling him a "third rate [g]randstander"; John Kerry quipped that he "tested positive for being an asshole"; Representative Sean Patrick Maloney tweeted, "@RepThomasMassie is indeed a dumbass"; Representative Dean Phillips called his actions a "principled but terribly misguided stunt". When Massie was confronted by a hostile press outside the House chamber, he said he was insulted by Trump's assertion: "I am at least second-rate." Some Republicans defended Massie: Paul Gosar called him a "good man and a solid conservative" and Chip Roy said Massie was "defending the Constitution today by requiring a quorum".

In an interview with Politico, Massie said that "the fact that they brought all of these congressmen here in order to get a quorum shows you that I was right. The Constitution requires a quorum to pass a bill, and they were planning to subvert the Constitution". He also questioned why people such as grocery store employees or truck drivers should be expected to work during the pandemic, but not members of Congress, who "make $174,000 a year" and have "the best health care in the world".

On April 23, 2020, Massie was one of five House members to vote against the Paycheck Protection Program and Health Care Enhancement Act, which added $320billion of funding for the Paycheck Protection Program. Trump signed the bill into law the next day.

In July 2020, Massie argued against face mask mandates and compulsory vaccinations. He faced allegations of antisemitism after comparing vaccine mandates to the Holocaust.

On January 30, 2022, Massie faced criticism for a Twitter attack on Anthony Fauci featuring a quote by neo-Nazi Kevin Alfred Strom.

Committee assignments 
 Committee on Oversight and Government Reform
 Subcommittee on Government Operations
 Subcommittee on Energy Policy, Health Care and Entitlements
 Committee on Science, Space and Technology
 Subcommittee on Energy
 Subcommittee on Technology
 Committee on Transportation and Infrastructure
 Subcommittee on Aviation
 Subcommittee on Railroads, Pipelines, and Hazardous Materials
 Subcommittee on Water Resources and Environment

Caucus memberships 
 Second Amendment Caucus
 Liberty Caucus

Political positions

Foreign policy 
Massie has supported various efforts to scale back the use of the U.S. military abroad. He supported legislation in 2019 to repeal the Authorization for Use of Military Force of 2001, arguing that it is too broad and that Congress should reclaim its constitutional right to declare war. He also supported efforts to withdraw U.S. forces from Iraq and Afghanistan, and introduced a bill in 2019 to clarify that no authority exists for military action against Iran. Massie introduced legislation to stop unauthorized military operations in Egypt and Syria, as well as legislation blocking unauthorized military aid from being sent to Syrian rebels.

Massie voted "present" on the 2015 Iran nuclear agreement, the only member of the House to do so and the only Republican not to vote against it. Massie was the only member of the House to vote against extending sanctions on Iran in 2016. He was also one of only three House members to vote against a 2017 bill to impose new sanctions on Iran, Russia, and North Korea and one of only three to vote against the Uyghur Forced Labor Prevention Act in 2020.

In 2019, Massie was the only Republican House member to vote against condemning the Boycott, Divestment and Sanctions (BDS) movement. Among other reasons that he cited for voting against the resolution, Massie stated that he does not support "federal efforts to condemn any type of private boycott, regardless of whether or not a boycott is based upon bad motives" and that "these are matters that Congress should properly leave to the States and to the people to decide".

In 2021, Massie was one of 14 House Republicans to vote against a measure condemning the Myanmar coup d'état that overwhelmingly passed. The same year, he joined eight Democratic representatives in voting against $1 billion in funding for Israel's Iron Dome air defense system, saying that he opposed all foreign aid out of concern about the national debt. Massie was among 19 House Republicans to vote against the final passage of the 2022 National Defense Authorization Act.

In 2019, Massie was the only member of Congress to oppose an act that refused to recognize Russia's annexation of Crimea. He was also one of three members to oppose a March 2022 resolution supporting Ukraine's sovereignty after it was invaded by Russia. He later amplified Russian claims that Ukraine was developing biological weapons. Referring to Victoria Nuland's statement that Ukraine had biological research facilities that the U.S. feared might be seized by Russia, Massie tweeted, "I didn’t take the concern over Ukrainian biological labs seriously ... until now".

Massie voted against allowing Sweden and Finland into NATO, saying he did not want to "subsidize socialist Europe's defense".

In 2023, Massie was among 47 Republicans to vote in favor of H.Con.Res. 21 which directed President Joe Biden to remove U.S. troops from Syria within 180 days.

Environment 
Massie rejects the scientific consensus on climate change. He has said, "I think the jury is still out on the contribution of our activities to the change in the earth's climate". In 2013, he implied that cold weather undercut the argument for climate change, tweeting, "Today's Science Committee Hearing on Global Warming canceled due to snow". During a 2019 House Oversight Committee hearing on the impact of climate change, Massie suggested that concerns over rising carbon dioxide levels were exaggerated.

Massie supports dismantling the Environmental Protection Agency. He voted to block the Department of Defense from spending on climate adaptation. He voted to repeal the Stream Protection Rule, which imposed stricter requirements on coal mining to prevent coal debris from getting into waterways.

In 2018, after French President Emmanuel Macron spoke to Congress and mentioned his desire that the United States rejoin the Paris Climate Accords to curb climate change, Massie said Macron was "a socialist militarist globalist science-alarmist. The dark future of the American Democratic Party".

Government surveillance 
Massie is a critic of the PATRIOT Act and warrantless surveillance of Americans. In 2014 he sponsored an amendment to stop warrantless "backdoor" searches of U.S. citizens' online data; it passed the House 293–123. The amendment also contained a provision prohibiting the NSA or CIA from requesting companies to install surveillance backdoors in their products.

In 2015 Massie introduced the Surveillance State Repeal Act, a bill that sought to repeal the PATRIOT Act and the FISA Amendments Act. Also in 2015, he joined with Representative Justin Amash in an effort to ensure the expiration of certain provisions of the PATRIOT Act.

Massie has called for NSA whistleblower Edward Snowden to be pardoned and for Director of National Intelligence James Clapper to be prosecuted for lying to Congress while under oath about the phone metadata program that Snowden exposed.

Gun rights 
Massie strongly supports expanded gun rights and co-chairs the Second Amendment Caucus. He has introduced and supported legislation that eliminates certain gun control measures and expands American citizens' gun rights. For example, during the 2019–2020 session, Massie introduced H.R. 2071, the "Second Amendment Protection Act", which would lift the federal prohibition on medical marijuana patients from owning or possessing firearms. In 2022, he introduced H.R. 7415, the "Safe Students Act", which would repeal the Gun-Free School Zones Act of 1990 (GFSZA), effectively repealing the federal ban on guns in school zones and allowing state and local governments and school boards to set their own firearms policies. Massie said: "Gun-free zones are ineffective and make our schools less safe. Since 1950, 98 percent of mass public shootings have occurred in places where citizens are banned from having guns." He added, "Banks, churches, sports stadiums, and many of my colleagues in Congress are protected with firearms, yet children inside the classroom are too frequently left vulnerable."

Massie has also criticized President Joe Biden's plans to regulate "ghost guns" by reclassifying gun kits as firearms under the Gun Control Act and requiring manufacturers to be licensed and inscribe serial numbers on gun kits. Massie tweeted, "The Constitution does not authorize the federal government to prevent you from making your own firearm. This a fact that has been recognized for 200+ years. Also, Article 1, Section 1 (literally the first operative sentence in the Constitution) says Congress makes law, not POTUS!"

Food regulation 

In 2014 Massie introduced the Milk Freedom Act and the Interstate Milk Freedom Act, a pair of bills that would allow the transportation of raw milk across state borders. Massie explained: "It's legal to drink raw milk in 50 states. It is legal to sell raw milk in 28 states. The Feds need to quit arresting farmers for taking raw milk from one raw milk state to another raw milk state".

In 2015 Massie introduced the Processing Revival and Intrastate Meat Exemption (PRIME) Act to ease federal regulations regarding the sale of meat within state borders. According to Massie, under current federal regulations "farmers and ranchers are increasingly forced to ship their animals to far-off slaughterhouses for processing" which "presents financial burdens, threatens the quality of meat sold, and ultimately makes it difficult for consumers to purchase fresh, local meat".

Criminal justice reform 
In 2013 Massie introduced the Justice Safety Valve Act to provide judges with greater sentencing flexibility. He stated: "The one size fits all approach of federally mandated minimums does not give local judges the latitude they need to ensure that punishments fit the crimes. As a result, nonviolent offenders are sometimes given excessive sentences. Furthermore, public safety can be compromised because violent offenders are released from our nation's overcrowded prisons to make room for nonviolent offenders."

Massie has criticized civil asset forfeiture laws, calling them "legal robbery" and "completely unconstitutional". In 2019 he helped introduce the Fifth Amendment Integrity Restoration Act to reform federal asset forfeiture policies.

Human rights 
In November 2019, Massie was the sole member of the United States Congress to vote against the Hong Kong Human Rights and Democracy Act and in December 2019 was the sole member of the House of Representatives to vote against a condemnation of the treatment of Uyghurs in China. Massie clarified on Twitter that his reasoning was that it is not the role of the United States to intervene in other nations' internal affairs. Massie also cast the sole "no" vote on the Uyghur Human Rights Policy Act.

On February 26, 2020, Massie voted against making lynching a federal hate crime. On February 28, 2022, he was one of three representatives to vote against the similar Emmett Till Antilynching Act.

Government transparency 
In 2014, Massie joined Representatives Walter B. Jones and Stephen Lynch at a press conference to call for release of the 28 redacted pages of the Joint Inquiry into Intelligence Community Activities before and after the Terrorist Attacks of September 11, 2001. In 2016 Massie joined both representatives in writing to Obama urging him to declassify the pages.

In 2015, Massie introduced the Federal Reserve Transparency Act to "require the Comptroller General to conduct a full examination of the Board of Governors of the Federal Reserve System and the Federal Reserve banks". Said Massie: "It is time to force the Federal Reserve to operate by the same standards of transparency and accountability to the taxpayers that we should demand of all government agencies."

Health care 
Massie supports repealing the Affordable Care Act. In 2017, he criticized Republicans' efforts to repeal parts of the Affordable Care Act, saying the efforts fell "far short of our promise to repeal Obamacare".

Massie does not support compulsory vaccination. He stated on Twitter, "There is no authority in the Constitution that authorizes the government to stick a needle in you."

Cannabis 
Massie has supported efforts to legalize industrial hemp cultivation, introducing the Industrial Hemp Farming Act in 2013 as well as hemp-related amendments in 2013, 2014, and 2015 that were approved by the House. In 2013 he testified before the Kentucky Senate regarding the matter.

Massie has stated that medical cannabis patients should be able to legally purchase firearms and that he would introduce legislation allowing them to do so. Massie has endorsed legislation in Kentucky to legalize the medical use of cannabis.

Disaster relief 
Massie is among a handful of members of Congress who consistently vote to block disaster relief. However, when Kentucky has been hit by natural disasters, Massie has supported disaster relief.

In February 2023, Massie and Marjorie Taylor Greene were the only two representatives to vote against a nonpartisan resolution mourning those killed in the 2023 Turkey–Syria earthquake.

Immigration 
Massie voted against the Further Consolidated Appropriations Act of 2020 which authorizes DHS to nearly double the available H-2B visas for the remainder of FY 2020.

Massie voted against Consolidated Appropriations Act (H.R. 1158) which effectively prohibits ICE from cooperating with Health and Human Services to detain or remove illegal alien sponsors of unaccompanied alien children (UACs).

In 2022, NumbersUSA, which seeks to reduce both legal and illegal immigration, gave him a 93% score; in 2019–20, the Federation for American Immigration Reform, which also supports immigration controls, gave him a 92% rating.

Other 
In October 2019, Massie criticized the jail sentence for Maria Butina, a Russian citizen who pleaded guilty to conspiring to act as a foreign agent in the United States. Butina had sought to infiltrate the National Rifle Association in order to influence a more favorable U.S. foreign policy towards Russia. Massie described her jail sentence as motivated by Russophobia. In August 2019, Massie said that former FBI Director James Comey should be put in prison instead of Butina.

In September 2020, Massie said Kyle Rittenhouse, who was charged with first-degree intentional homicide after shooting two people at a protest following the shooting of Jacob Blake in Kenosha, Wisconsin, had shown "incredible restraint", noting that Rittenhouse "didn't empty a magazine into a crowd."

Massie describes himself as a constitutional conservative. He believes in intellectual property and thinks it is necessary for incentivizing innovation. Massie has remarked that this is one of the areas where he is not a libertarian.

Massie is a part of a small group of Republicans who voted against a House resolution reaffirming commitment to the orderly and peaceful transfer of power in the United States under democratic principles. He was also one of seven Republicans who did not support their colleagues' efforts to challenge the results of the 2020 presidential election on January 6, 2021; these seven signed a letter that, while giving credence to election fraud allegations made by President Donald Trump, said Congress did not have the authority to influence the election's outcome.

In June 2021, Massie was one of 21 House Republicans to vote against a resolution to give the Congressional Gold Medal to police officers who defended the U.S. Capitol on January 6. Also in June 2021, he was one of 14 House Republicans to vote against legislation to establish June 19, or Juneteenth (officially named "Juneteenth National Independence Day"), as a federal holiday. He said he "fully support[ed] creating a day to celebrate the abolition of slavery" but opposed its being named "Independence Day."

On June 27, 2021, Massie said he and Representatives Marjorie Taylor Greene and Ralph Norman were suing Speaker Nancy Pelosi after they were fined for refusing to wear masks on the House floor.

Electoral history

Personal life 
Massie operates a cattle farm in Garrison, Kentucky, with his wife, Rhonda, and their four children. They live in a solar-powered home that Massie built. He is a Methodist.

On December 4, 2021, Massie drew criticism for posting on his Twitter account a family Christmas photo with an assortment of guns, just days after four teenagers had been killed in the 2021 Oxford High School shooting. Massie said he did not intend for the card to offend but went on to say, "I was like: 'Wow, the world's not gonna see this. It'd be kinda fun to just share it.' And I shared it, and I didn't just kick the hornet's nest, I agitated every hornet on the planet."

References

External links 

 Congressman Thomas Massie official U.S. House website
 Thomas Massie for Congress
 
 

|-

|-

1971 births
Living people
21st-century American businesspeople
21st-century American inventors
21st-century American politicians
21st-century Methodists
Activists from Kentucky
American gun rights activists
American electrical engineers
American libertarians
American mechanical engineers
American Methodists
County judges in Kentucky
Lemelson–MIT Prize
Methodists from Kentucky
MIT School of Engineering alumni
Non-interventionism
People from Vanceburg, Kentucky
Politicians from Huntington, West Virginia
Republican Party members of the United States House of Representatives from Kentucky
Tea Party movement activists